Arcola is an unincorporated community and census-designated place in Lake Township, Allen County, in the U.S. state of Indiana. The population of the community is only 33.

Once a booming train station for farm products and a regional U.S. postal center in the late 19th and early 20th centuries, in more recent years it has become a bedroom community of Fort Wayne. The community has a volunteer fire department and an elementary school in the building which once housed grades one through twelve, including Arcola High School. The famous annual Arcola tractor pull (arcolapull.org), is held in the community.

History
The Arcola post office was established in 1858. The name of the community commemorates the Battle of Arcola.

Geography
Arcola is at the intersection of Eme Rd and Arcola road, two miles east of the Allen-Whitley county line.

References

Unincorporated communities in Allen County, Indiana
Unincorporated communities in Indiana
Fort Wayne, IN Metropolitan Statistical Area
Census-designated places in Allen County, Indiana